Lazar may refer to:
 Lazar (name), any of various persons with this name
 Lazar BVT, Serbian mine resistant, ambush-protected, armoured vehicle
 Lazar 2, Serbian armored vehicle
 Lazar 3, Serbian armored van
 Lazăr, a tributary of the river Jiul de Vest in Hunedoara County, Romania

See also
Lazar house, former term for leper colony
Knights of St Lazarus
Lazarus (disambiguation)
Lăzărești (disambiguation)
Lazard (disambiguation)
Laser (disambiguation)
Lazer (disambiguation)
Lazare (disambiguation)
LazarBeam (born 1994), Australian YouTuber